Cyrtorhinus caricis is a species of plant bug in the family Miridae.  It is found in Europe except the far South and across the Palearctic to Siberia, China, Korea Japan and North America.

Biology
C.caricis is associated with Scirpus , Schoenoplectus, Carex,  Juncus and Typha

References

Further reading

 
 
 

Insects described in 1807
Orthotylini
Taxa named by Carl Fredrik Fallén